Monster Tale is a Nintendo DS platformer and virtual pet game developed by DreamRift and published by Majesco Entertainment in 2011. It was only released in North America. It follows the story of a young girl, named Ellie, and her adventures in Monster World with her monster companion, Chomp. Together they must stop the evil Kid-Kings and return Monster World to its rightful inhabitants, the monsters, and also find a way for Ellie to return home.

Voice talent
 Ellie - Brina Palencia
 Meade - Todd Haberkorn
 Deanu - Leah Clark
 Zoe - Monica Rial
 Ethan - Cynthia Cranz
 Priscilla - Tia Ballard

Controversy
According to the game developers, there was pressure from publishers not to feature a young female lead. Peter Ong, the co-founder of DreamRift and director of Monster Tale, told Nintendo Power that "this choice was actually somewhat controversial with some publishers. Our experience was that many publishers are looking to avert the risk of a main character that hasn't been proven to capture large audiences. As a result, there was some concern from publishers that Ellie should change to a male or a more mature/sexy female."

Reception

Monster Tale received "generally favorable reviews" according to the review aggregation website Metacritic. Critics praised the game for its sprite-based graphics, interesting combat and its action-platforming similar to the Metroid series.

Remake
On March 29, 2015, DreamRift announced a remake of the game, titled Monster Tale Ultimate, to be released via the Nintendo 3DS eShop. Announced changes to Ultimate included reduced backtracking, visual improvements, and the ability to toggle between the original soundtrack and a new orchestral soundtrack. However the 3DS version failed to ever release. On January 11, 2021, Majesco announced that Monster Tale would soon be coming to modern platforms.

References

External links
 

2011 video games
Action-adventure games
Cancelled Nintendo 3DS games
Fantasy video games
Majesco Entertainment games
Metroidvania games
Nintendo DS games
Nintendo DS-only games
North America-exclusive video games
Video games developed in the United States
Video games featuring female protagonists
Virtual pet video games